Cultural Correspondence was a journal of leftist politics and cultural commentary published from 1975 to around 1985. According to one of its founders, Paul Buhle, the magazine was "born from the collapse of the New Left and hopes for a new beginning of a social movement, but also of left-wing thinking about culture". Cultural Correspondence was part of a wave of cultural criticism journals founded in the 1970s that addressed popular culture. Buhle and Dave Wagner were its founding editors. They had previously collaborated on Radical America, but after they moved to different locations, their letters to each other led to the idea for Cultural Correspondence. The journal was originally published in Providence, Rhode Island. Some of the early issues were also produced in collaboration with the Green Mountain Irregulars. 

Cultural Correspondence typically published leftist social commentary, with a particular emphasis on poetry, humor, and comics. Contributors to the magazine included: C. L. R. James, George Lipsitz, Edith Hoshino Altbach, Eva Cockcroft, and R. Crumb.

In May 1981, Paul Buhle and James Murray met on the way to an anti-Reagan demonstration. Following the fourteenth issue of Cultural Correspondences initial run, Murray and Lucy Lippard collaborated with Buhle on a new series of Cultural Correspondence, as a project of Political Art Documentation/Distribution (PAD/D). After this, the magazine was published in New York. Around the same time in 1982, Cultural Correspondence also organized the Radical Humor Conference and Festival in New York, a conference of "Left-academic self-ridicule". The influence of PAD/D (with its interest in archiving and artistic activism) on Cultural Correspondence can be seen in the third issue of its new series, which deviated from the magazine's normal format by including a long directory of artistic political projects. That issue was titled We will not be disappeared!: Directory of Arts Activism.

An archive of Cultural Correspondence issues is held in a digital repository by the Brown University Library. A PDF copy of the Fall 1979 issue "Surrealism & Its Popular Accomplices," of Cultural Correspondence is available at darkmatterarchives.net

References 

Defunct political magazines published in the United States

Alternative magazines
Magazines published in New York City
Left-wing activism